The Western Equatoria gubernatorial election took place in April 2010, alongside elections for the Governorships of Sudan's other states as part of the wider Sudanese general election, to elect the Governor of Western Equatoria. In a rare upset, incumbent SPLM Governor Jemma Nunu Kumba was defeated by the Independent candidate Col. Bangasi Joseph Bakosoro.

Results

References

Gubernatorial elections in Sudan